The second season of Chicago Fire, an American drama television series with executive producer Dick Wolf, and producers Derek Haas, Michael Brandt, and Matt Olmstead, premiered on September 24, 2013, but on a new timeslot on Tuesday at 10:00 pm from Wednesday at 10:00 pm, on NBC television network. The season concluded on May 13, 2014, and consisted of 22 episodes.

Overview
The show follows the lives of the firefighters and paramedics working for the Chicago Fire Department at the firehouse of Engine 51, Truck 81, Squad 3, Ambulance 61 and Battalion 25.

Cast and characters

Main cast
 Jesse Spencer as Lieutenant Matthew Casey, Truck 81
 Taylor Kinney as Lieutenant Kelly Severide, Squad 3
 Monica Raymund as Paramedic in Charge Gabriela Dawson, Ambulance 61
 Lauren German as Paramedic Leslie Shay, Ambulance 61
 Charlie Barnett as Firefighter Peter Mills, Truck 81/Squad 3
 Eamonn Walker as Battalion Chief Wallace Boden, Battalion 25
 David Eigenberg as Firefighter Christopher Hermann, Truck 81
 Yuri Sardarov as Firefighter Brian "Otis" Zvonecek, Truck 81
 Joe Minoso as Firefighter/Chauffeur Joe Cruz, Truck 81
 Christian Stolte as Firefighter Randy "Mouch" McHolland, Truck 81

Recurring cast
 Jeff Hephner as Firefighter Jeff Clarke, Squad 3
 Randy Flagler as Firefighter Harold Capp, Squad 3
 Anthony Ferraris as Firefighter Tony Ferraris, Squad 3
 Treat Williams as Benny Severide
 Chaon Cross as Heather Darden
 Michelle Forbes as Gail McLeod
 John Hoogenakker as Lieutenant Spellman, Engine 51
 Vedette Lim as Devon
 William Smillie as Kevin Hadley
 David Pasquesi as Paramedic Erik McAuley, Ambulance 61
 Victoria Blade as Lisa Clarke
 Alex Weisman as Paramedic Alan Chout, Ambulance 61
 Melissa Ponzio as Donna Robbins
 Dylan Baker as Doctor David Arata
 Brittany Curran as Katie Nolan
 Daisy Betts as Firefighter Candidate Rebecca Jones, Truck 81
 Christine Evangelista as Paramedic Allison Rafferty, Ambulance 61
 Brent Seabrook as friend of Clarke
 Duncan Keith as friend of Clarke

Chicago PD characters
 Jon Seda as Detective Antonio Dawson
 LaRoyce Hawkins as Officer Kevin Atwater
 Jesse Lee Soffer as Detective Jay Halstead
 Jason Beghe as Sergeant Henry "Hank" Voight
 Sophia Bush as Detective Erin Lindsay
 Elias Koteas as Detective Alvin Olinsky
 Marina Squerciati as Officer Kim Burgess
 Amy Morton as Desk Sergeant Trudy Platt

Episodes

Production
On April 26, 2013, NBC renewed Chicago Fire for a second season and moved its time slot to Tuesdays at 10:00 pm EST. The season debuted on September 24, 2013.

Crossovers
A crossover between the two Chicago shows aired on April 29 and 30, 2014, depicting an explosion that brings the fire and police departments together.

Home media
The DVD release of season two was released in Region 1 on September 2, 2014.

References

External links
 
 

2013 American television seasons
2014 American television seasons
Chicago Fire (TV series) seasons